Kathleen Barry (born January 22, 1941) is an American sociologist and feminist. After researching and publishing books on international human sex trafficking, she cofounded the United Nations NGO, the Coalition Against Trafficking in Women (CATW). In 1985 she received the Wonder Woman Foundation Award for her strides towards the empowerment of women. She has taught at Brandeis University and Penn State University.

Works
Barry's first book, Female Sexual Slavery (1979), prompted international awareness of human sex trafficking  and has been translated into six languages. Her follow-up to Female Sexual Slavery, The Prostitution of Sexuality (1995) discusses the idea of "consent" in liberal modern American discourse, concluding that "every form of oppression is sustained" through apparent consent by the oppressed group or class to their exploitation. She further concludes that the normalization and acceptance of prostitution based on arguments of prostitutes' consent ignores the human-rights principle that violation cannot be consented to. She states that women, as members of an oppressed class under patriarchy, are compelled to "consent" to their own sexual exploitation by society, much in the way a Marxist would say workers are compelled to cooperate with their oppressors, the capitalists.

Education
Barry has two Ph.Ds from the University of California, Berkeley, one in sociology and one in education.

Bibliography

Books
Female Sexual Slavery, 1979
Vietnam's Women in Transition, 1995
The Prostitution of Sexuality, 1995
Susan B. Anthony: A Biography of a Singular Feminist, 2000 
Unmaking War, Remaking Men: How Empathy Can Reshape Our Politics, Our Soldiers and Ourselves, 2010

Other writings
 "The Vagina on Trial" (1971)

References

External links
 
 Kathleen Barry's Bibliography at Amazon.com

1941 births
Living people
Pennsylvania State University faculty
Brandeis University faculty
American women's rights activists
American women sociologists
American sociologists
Anti-prostitution feminists
American feminist writers
Radical feminists
UC Berkeley College of Letters and Science alumni
UC Berkeley Graduate School of Education alumni